Sylwester Lusiusz (born 18 September 1999) is a Polish professional footballer who plays as a midfielder for Sandecja Nowy Sącz, on loan from Cracovia.

Honours

Club
Cracovia
Polish Cup: 2019–20

References

External links

1999 births
Living people
People from Brzozów County
Polish footballers
Association football midfielders
MKS Cracovia (football) players
Sandecja Nowy Sącz players
Ekstraklasa players
I liga players
III liga players
Poland youth international footballers
Poland under-21 international footballers